Dimitar Stefanov Mantov was a Bulgarian historical novelist.

Biography 
He was born on October 13, 1930 in the village of Bosilkovtsi, Ruse region in a family of teachers. He received his primary education in his native village, graduated from high school in the town of Polski Trambesh. As a student he edited the youth literary magazines "Young Creator" (1945–1946) in Polski Trambesh and "Spring" (1947).

He graduated from Sofia University and initially worked as lawyer, and later as journalist and editor at Narodna Mladezh Publishing House and at the Center for Literary Information. He was author of the scripts for the documentaries "Old Manuscripts", "Balkan War", "Aleko Konstantinov" as well as author of mostly historical novels and several adventure novels. He died on July 28, 2008.

Bibliography

Novels 
 Kaloyan, King of the Bulgarians (1958)
 Ivan Asen, Tsar and Autocrat (1960)
 The Stone Nest (1966)
 The Great Day (1966)
 Bandit's Blood (1969)
 Evil Land (1970)
 The Devil's Carousel (1971)
 Crazy Heads (1972)
 Khan Krum (1973)
 Yuvigi Khan Omurtag (1974)
 The Toothed Sun (1975)
 Red Calendar (1976)
 The Auls of Khan Omurtag (1976)
 The Albigensian Legend (1977)
 Prince Boris I (1978)
 Carpetrovo time (1981)
 The Hawk (1981)
 Sign on a stone (1982)
 The Winds Leave Traces (1982)
 The Great March (1983)
 South Bulgarian Chronicle (1985)
 Haydut Velko (1985)
 Via Mala (1985)
 The Wolf Bridge (1987)
 Haiduti walking on the sea (1988)
 The Day of Redemption (1988)
 Troubled Year (1990)
 Abagar and the Witches (1999)
 Night in Kabyle (2000)
 The invisible rope (2002)

Romanized biographies 
 The Lucky Man (for Aleko Konstantinov) (1963)
 Pencho Slaveykov (The Last Days of the Poet) (1969)
 The Patriot (Hristo G. Danov) (1969)

Stories 
 The Price of Silence (1962)
 The Steps of Hope (1971)

Historical Essays 
 Horse to Horse, Young Man to Young Man (1962)
 Wind echoes, Balkan moans (1963)
 Old Capital Cities (1973)

He also wrote historical essays from the Father's Hearth Library - "Svishtov" (1962), "Elena" (1964), "Lyaskovets" (1965) and "Nessebar" (1965), bulgarian cuisine receipts in "Bulgarian Cuisine", as well as the children's book - "Tales for Holidays" (2005).

References

External links
Dimitar Mantov at Chitanka.info
 

2008 deaths
Bulgarian historical fiction writers
1930 births
Sofia University alumni
Writers of historical fiction set in the Middle Ages
Bulgarian biographers
Living people